Corpus Delicti is a 2017 Philippine crime action film co-written and directed by Toto Natividad. The film stars Xian Lim, Marco Gumabao, Vin Abrenica and Raymond Bagatsing.

Plot
A young police officer (Xian Lim) is put to the test when his next case is too close to home. He sets on a dangerous mission to track down the murderer who killed his brother.

Cast
 Xian Lim as Mark Mondejar
 Marco Gumabao as Robin Mondejar
 Vin Abrenica as Julius Arcega
 Shamaine Buencamino as Lydia Mondejar
 Loren Burgos as Rose Martinez
 Franchesca Floirendo as Sam Alvarez
 Raymond Bagatsing as Bert Corpuz
 Oliver Aquino as Noel Corpuz
 Robin Tapeno as Benzon
 Richard Manabat as Warden
 Migui Moreno as Santos
 Tom Olivar as Alviz
 Dido dela Paz as Timbol
 Leon Miguel as Dodong

References

External links

2017 films
2017 crime action films
Filipino-language films
Philippine crime action films
Star Cinema films
Films directed by Toto Natividad